The Surrender of Lord Cornwallis is an oil painting by John Trumbull. The painting, which was completed in 1820, now hangs in the rotunda of the United States Capitol in Washington, D.C.

The painting depicts the surrender of British Lieutenant General Charles, Earl Cornwallis at Yorktown, Virginia, on October 19, 1781, ending the Siege of Yorktown, which virtually guaranteed American independence. Included in the depiction are many leaders of the American troops that took part in the Siege of Yorktown.

Commission

Artist John Trumbull (1756–1843) spent the early part of the American Revolutionary War as a soldier, serving as an aide to both George Washington and Horatio Gates.  After resigning from the army in 1777, he pursued a career as an artist.  In 1785 he began sketching out ideas for a series of large-scale paintings to commemorate the major events of the American Revolution.  After spending a time in England, he returned to New York City in 1789, where he sketched a number of dignitaries whose portraits he intended to use in these paintings.  In 1791 he traveled to Yorktown, Virginia, where he sketched the landscape of the surrender site.

Upon his return from Britain after the end of the War of 1812, he promoted this idea to the United States Congress.  On the strength of his application and the successful exhibition of The Death of General Warren at the Battle of Bunker's Hill, June 17, 1775 and The Death of General Montgomery in the Attack on Quebec, December 31, 1775, as well as studies for other proposed paintings, the Congress in 1817 voted to commission four large paintings from him, to be hung in the United States Capitol rotunda.

The price was set at $8,000 per painting, with the size and subject matter to be determined by President James Madison.  A size of twelve by eighteen feet (370 cm × 550 cm) was agreed, as was the subject matter for the four paintings: the Declaration of Independence, the Surrender of General Burgoyne, the Surrender of Lord Cornwallis, and General George Washington Resigning His Commission.  Trumbull spent the next eight years executing the commission, completing this painting in 1820.  It was displayed in New York City, Boston, and Baltimore before coming to Washington, D.C., and Trumbull supervised its hanging in the Capitol rotunda in late 1820.  It has remained there since.

Trumbull himself cleaned and varnished the painting in 1828, and it has been periodically maintained since.  In 1971, damage from a penny that was thrown hard enough to pierce the canvas was repaired. All of the Rotunda paintings were most recently cleaned in 2008.

Description

The subject of this painting is the surrender of the British army at Yorktown, Virginia, in 1781, which ended the last major campaign of the Revolutionary War. The blue sky filled with dark clouds and the broken cannon suggest the battles that led to this event. In early September, entrenched with a force of 7,000 men, Cornwallis had hoped for rescue from the sea, but the British vessels were repelled by a French fleet. Within weeks General Washington had deployed a much larger army, and his artillery bombarded the British positions in early October. After American and French troops overran two British strongholds, Cornwallis surrendered on October 19, 1781.

In the center of the scene, American General Benjamin Lincoln appears mounted on a white horse. He extends his right hand toward the sword carried by the surrendering British officer, General Charles O'Hara, who heads the long line of troops that extends into the background. To the left, French officers appear standing and mounted beneath the white banner of the royal Bourbon family. On the right are American officers beneath the Stars and Stripes; among them are the Marquis de Lafayette and Colonel Jonathan Trumbull, the brother of the painter. General George Washington, riding a brown horse, stayed in the background because Cornwallis himself was not present for the surrender. The Comte de Rochambeau is on the left center on a brown horse.

See also
 Southern theater of the American Revolutionary War
 Convention Army

Notes

References

External links
Architect of the Capitol Web page on the painting

Paintings about the American Revolution
1820 paintings
New York (state) in the American Revolution
Paintings by John Trumbull
Paintings in the United States Capitol
Flags in art
Horses in art
Cultural depictions of military officers
Cultural depictions of British men
George Washington in art